Big Brother 4 nominations table may refer to:
 Big Brother Australia 2004 nominations table
 Big Brother 2003 nominations table (UK)